Ambrose Jerome Kennedy (January 6, 1893 – August 29, 1950) was a U.S. Representative from Maryland.

Born in Baltimore, Maryland, Kennedy attended parochial schools, Calvert Hall College, and Polytechnic Institute. He was employed as a clerk for an insurance company from 1909 to 1924, and engaged in the brokerage and insurance business in 1924. He was an unsuccessful candidate for election to the Maryland House of Delegates in 1918, and served as member of the Baltimore City Council from 1922 to 1926. He served in the Maryland Senate in 1928 and 1929, and served as delegate to the Democratic National Convention in 1928 and 1932. He was appointed parole commissioner of Maryland in 1929 and served until elected to Congress.

Kennedy was elected as a Democrat to the Seventy-second Congress to fill the vacancy caused by the death of John Charles Linthicum and on the same day was elected to the Seventy-third Congress. He was reelected to the Seventy-fourth, Seventy-fifth, and Seventy-sixth Congresses and served from November 8, 1932, to January 3, 1941. In Congress, he served as chairman of the Committee on Claims (Seventy-fourth, Seventy-fifth, and Seventy-sixth Congresses), but was an unsuccessful candidate for renomination in 1940.

He resumed the brokerage and insurance business in Baltimore, as well as serving as a member of the State Unemployment Compensation Board from June 1943 to September 1945. In November 1943, he sought an appointment as the president of the Baltimore City Council but lost to C. Markland Kelly (a member of the Baltimore Park board) since 1935. By 1950, he was a senior vice-president of the insurance firm Poor, Bowen, Barlett and Kennedy. He died at Mercy Hospital in Baltimore at age 57, and is interred in the New Cathedral Cemetery. A Baltimore city park located at Valley Street and E. Chase Street is named in honor of Ambrose Kennedy, who lived nearby at 914 E. Biddle Street and attended the nearby St. John the Evangelist Catholic Church.

Ambrose J. Kennedy, Jr. (1918–1989)
Kennedy's son, Ambrose J. Kennedy, Jr. (1918–1989) followed his father into politics after helping with his father's Congressional campaigns. In 1946, Kennedy, Jr. joined the Baltimore City Council representing an area of midtown Baltimore bounded by Druid Hill Avenue, Preston Street, and Aisquith Street. During his two terms in office, Kennedy, Jr. chaired the Highway and Franchise Committee. After leaving office in the mid-1950s, he worked as a broker for the Poor, Bowen, Bartlett and Kennedy insurance company established by his father.

References

1893 births
1950 deaths
Democratic Party Maryland state senators
Baltimore City Council members
Democratic Party members of the United States House of Representatives from Maryland
20th-century American politicians